Crackers is a studio/compilation album by the British rock band Slade. It was released on 18 November 1985 and reached No. 34 in the UK charts. It was certified Gold by the BPI that same month. The album was produced by bassist Jim Lea except "All Join Hands", "Do You Believe in Miracles", "My Oh My" and "Run Runaway", which were all produced by John Punter. The album contained a mix of the band's previous hits, some re-recorded songs and a selection of covers.

On Crackers, Slade tried to create an LP that had a party atmosphere to it. Since its original release, the album has had numerous re-issues over the years with somewhat different titles and various additional phrases on the cover art, including having "The Christmas Party Album" on the cover art of an older version, using the titles Slade's Crazee Christmas! (1999) and The Party Album (2001), and adding the phrase "The Rockin' Party Album!" (2006). There has also been some variation in the tracks on the album in re-releases.

Background
Following the release of the band's 1985 studio album Rogues Gallery, the band were approached by Telstar to create a Christmas-related party album. The album included cover versions of "Let's Dance", "Santa Claus Is Coming to Town", "Hi Ho Silver Lining", "Let's Have a Party!", "Do They Know It's Christmas?" and "Auld Lang Syne/You'll Never Walk Alone". The band re-recorded their own past hits "Cum on Feel the Noize" and "Get Down and Get with It". The remaining eight tracks were previously recorded songs from the band's catalogue, including the new single "Do You Believe in Miracles". The album was a success in the UK, where it reached No. 34 and was certified Gold. The later 1999 release Slade's Crazee Christmas would chart several times on the UK Budget Albums Chart between 2001-05.

Although Slade's label RCA released "Do You Believe in Miracles" as a single, a deal was struck with Telstar to include the song on Crackers. After the single peaked at No. 54 in the UK, it was suggested that its inclusion on the album had caused it to fail to reach a higher charting. In a 1986 interview, drummer Don Powell said: "That could be a reason. Funnily enough, that was one of the bones of contention - Telstar said that they wanted it on the album, whereas we didn't because that would mean that it would split the sales between the single and the album. I know that if I personally like someone's single, and it's going to be on their latest album, then I'll wait and buy the album."

Recording
Speaking of recording the album in a 1986 interview, guitarist Dave Hill said: "I enjoyed making the tracks for Crackers a lot more than those for Rogues Gallery." In his own interview that year, Powell revealed his thoughts on the Crackers project: "Well, we were a bit dubious at first, we thought that it might have been another Black Lace type of thing. When we actually recorded the cover versions though, we had a great time doing them. We just went into the studio and put them down one after the other - it was like playing live on stage."

While recording Crackers, Hill discovered Victor Herman, a busker, who was playing bagpipes in Oxford Street, London. As the band were due to record their own version of "Auld Lang Syne", Hill he invited Herman to add an authentic touch to the recording. Herman agreed, and when he'd finished recording his part, Slade gave him an envelope with a sizeable sum of money in it, along with their thanks and best wishes. Two days later, the envelope was returned by post, along with a letter from Herman, saying that he'd enjoyed himself so much in the studio that he didn't want the money. Slade later invited him to their Christmas party on 18 November 1985 – the release day of the album. At the party, Slade presented Herman with one of the band's Gold Discs as a keepsake.

Track listing

Crackers: The Christmas Party Album (1985)

Crackers: The Rockin' Party Album! (2006)

Critical reception

Dave Thompson of AllMusic retrospectively described the album as "simultaneously the most joyously raucous, loud and singalong album in the entire Slade catalog, and the single most detestable record they ever made. He added "the entire album is so buoyant and boisterous that even hermits could play it, and believe they're having fun", but questioned whether it could be considered "a proper Slade album". In 2010, Classic Rock felt the album should be "avoided", stating: "This turkey was very much a nadir for Slade. The combination of re-recorded hits and festive fare achieved its commercial goal, but the album's very existence slammed the credibility of HMS Slade amidships like some unforgiving German torpedo."

Chart performance

Original release

Reissue "Slade's Crazee Christmas"

Personnel
Slade
Noddy Holder – lead vocals, rhythm guitar
Dave Hill – lead guitar, backing vocals
Jim Lea – bass, keyboards, backing vocals, producer
Don Powell – drums

Additional credits
John Punter – producer (tracks 6, 9, 12-13)
Victor Herman – bagpipes on "Auld Lang Syne" (uncredited)
Dave Garland – engineer

References

1985 Christmas albums
Christmas albums by English artists
Slade albums
Covers albums
Albums produced by John Punter
Albums produced by Jim Lea